Tá no Ar: a TV na TV (or simply Tá no Ar) was a Brazilian sitcom created by Marcelo Adnet, Marcius Melhem and Maurício Farias for Rede Globo. The series satirizes some Brazilian television programs, including the other stations. The series was written by Adnet and Melhem, with Farias directing. Since its debut, Tá no Ar was well received by critics and having great repercussion on internet

Production

Development

On January 28, 2013, comedian Marcelo Adnet is hired by TV Globo, after leaving the MTV Brasil.

His first program, O Dentista Mascarado, created by Fernanda Young and Alexandre Machado, had low ratings, which resulted in its cancellation after 12 episodes. After the end of the program, Adnet was added to the cast of Fantástico, producing parody and entertainment blocks. However, he eventually left the program later.

Later, TV Globo asked Marcius Melhem, who had just finished Os Caras de Pau, to produce a comedy show starring Adnet. Melhem created a sketch comedy program, but with a different style from the other programs of this format in Brazil, very similar to TV Pirata, satirical series that made a big success on TV Globo in the 80's.

Globo is well known for not citing programs of other stations. About this "policy" Adnet said: "[...] that was never a problem. [...]"

Release
The series was officially launched by TV Globo on April 2, 2014, during the "vem_aí" event in which the broadcaster launches its programming. The program was announced by Adnet himself.

For the 2014 season, Globo climbed A Grande Família and Doce de Mãe/A Segunda Dama to compose the Thursday night grid. The premiere took place on the third slot of shows, which is usually shown between 11:30 PM12:30 AM.

Cast

Episodes

Season 1 (2014)

Season 2 (2015)

Season 3 (2016)

Season 4 (2017)

Reception

Ratings
In the 2014 season, the main program of TV Globo, the 9PM telenovela (at the time, "Em Família"), had been recording lousy viewing figures, a large rejection of the public and critics, creating a "domino effect". The shows was directly affected, and long-standing programs such as A Grande Família hit historic negative record ratings.
 	
The show's debut recorded 10 rating points in IBOPE, considering the measurement to São Paulo, and 11 points in Rio, the two major advertising markets in Brazil. This hearing is considered "satisfactory". Despite the good start, the ratings ebbed and flowed, and the program was in second place in its exhibition schedule sometimes. The average of the first season was 9.2 points.

Critical
The debut of the series was well received by critics. Fernando Oliveira, of R7, labeled it "best premiere", and highlighted the satires and references to other programs. Mauricio Stycer, of Universo Online (UOL), was positive, and highlighted the parody of a northeastern activist.

Awards and nominations

References

 
Rede Globo original programming
Brazilian comedy television series
Television sketch shows
Black comedy
Television series about television
Portuguese-language television shows
2014 Brazilian television series debuts
2019 Brazilian television series endings
2010s Brazilian television series